Mitch McVicker is a GMA Dove Award-winning contemporary Christian Music singer-songwriter.

Biography
McVicker attended Friends University in Wichita, Kansas, in the early-1990s where he met and befriended the late CCM recording artist, Rich Mullins. After graduating in May 1995, McVicker moved to New Mexico, eventually touring and writing songs with Mullins.

With Mullins and song collaborator Beaker, McVicker co-wrote the musical, The Canticle of the Plains, which is based on the life and teachings of Saint Francis of Assisi. Completed in late 1996, McVicker sang lead vocals on four of the project's songs: "There You Are", "Heaven is Waiting", "Things Even Angels", and "You Are All".

McVicker began recording his first solo project in the summer of 1997 with the help of Mullins and Mark Robertson. On the night of September 19, 1997, McVicker and Mullins were en route to a benefit concert being held in Wichita, Kansas, and were involved in a serious auto accident after the Jeep they were riding in rolled over and ejected both occupants who were not wearing seat belts. McVicker was seriously injured while Mullins instantly died at the scene after being struck by a semi-trailer truck that swerved to avoid hitting the overturned vehicle. McVicker has since suffered from double-vision as a result of the accident.

McVicker was unable to resume work on his debut album for several months but eventually released the album in 1998 as the self-titled album, Mitch McVicker. Both "Take Hold of Me" and "Here and Now" received extensive airplay on CCM stations across the United States.

Rich Mullins' last songwriting effort, The Jesus Record, was also released in 1998. "My Deliverer", a track co-written by Mullins and McVicker, earned a GMA Dove Award for the 1999 Song of the Year.

Subsequent albums released by McVicker include Chasing the Horizon (2000), Without Looking Down (2002), Love Will Rise (2007), Always Believe (2009), Everything Shines (2010), Walking Through the Dark (2011), Underneath (2013), The Grey: When Black & White Fade (2014), Live in Morton, (2016), and The Acceptance of And (2018).

Along with recording, McVicker maintains an extensive touring schedule performing between 100 and 200 concerts a year. In his live performances, McVicker is known for his use of household props to create background percussion loops using a loop sequencer.

Album discography
 Mitch McVicker (1998)
 Chasing the Horizon (2000)
 Without Looking Down (2002)
 Love Will Rise (2007)
 Always Believe (2009)
 Everything Shines (2010)
 Walking Through the Dark (2011)
 Underneath (2013)
 The Grey: When Black & White Fade (2014)
 The Acceptance of And (2018)
A Shrugging of the Shoulders (2021)

Other 

 Canticle of the Plains (1997)
 Music Inspired by the Motion Picture Ragamuffin (Based on the Life of Rich Mullins) (2014)
Live in Morton (2016)

Awards

External links
 

American performers of Christian music
Living people
Friends University alumni
Year of birth missing (living people)